Thirty-five Years in the Punjab is an English book, published in 1908, written by George Robert Elsmie, a civil officer in the Panjab for thirty-five years (1858-1893).
 This book consists mainly of extracts from letters and diaries by the author as he journeyed through the region.

See also 
Panjab Castes, by Denzil Ibbetson

References 

1908 non-fiction books
English-language books
English non-fiction books
Books about British India